Crepidochares aridula is a moth in the Eriocottidae family. It was described by Davis in 1990. It is found in central Chile.

Adults are on wing from the end of October to December.

Etymology
The species name refers to the more xeric habitat of this species and is derived from Latin aridulus (diminutive of dry).

References

Moths described in 1990
Eriocottidae
Lepidoptera of Chile
Endemic fauna of Chile